The September Issue is a 2009 American documentary film directed by R.J. Cutler about the behind-the-scenes drama that follows editor-in-head Anna Wintour and her staff during the production of the September 2007 issue of American Vogue magazine.

The film was released in Australia on August 20, 2009, after being screened at numerous film festivals including Sundance, Zurich, Silverdocs, and Sheffield Doc/Fest. It was released in select theaters in the United States on August 28, 2009, by Roadside Attractions.

Synopsis
The film revolves around the making of the Vogue September 2007 issue. (The September Vogue is traditionally the biggest, most important issue of the year.) It depicts the effort that goes into making the magazine, and the passion that Grace Coddington, a former model turned creative director and the only person who dares to stand up to Anna Wintour, has for the highly regarded fashion magazine. In the film, Coddington is often portrayed as the leading victim to Wintour's aggressive personality. The relationship between Wintour and Coddington reveals itself to be symbiotic, as Wintour recognizes Coddington's expertise and keen eye for design. In the end, Wintour approves most of Coddington's ideas and they appear in the final version of the September issue.

Notable fashion icons
The film features appearances by many well-known and influential people in the fashion industry, from top editorial models to noted fashion photographers and designers.

Designers

 John Galliano
 Oscar de la Renta
 Jean-Paul Gaultier
 Nicolas Ghesquière
 Karl Lagerfeld

 Thakoon Panichgul
 Stefano Pilati
 Jane Thompson
 Isabel Toledo
 Vera Wang

Models

 Coco Rocha
 Caroline Trentini
 Daria Werbowy
 Raquel Zimmermann
 Hilary Rhoda

 Sienna Miller
 Chanel Iman
 Lily Donaldson
 Lily Cole

Photographers

 Patrick Demarchelier
 Steven Klein
 Craig McDean
 Mario Testino
 David Sims

Others

 Hamish Bowles
 Edward Enninful
 Si Newhouse
 André Leon Talley
 Robert Verdi

Critical response

The September Issue received generally positive reviews. On Rotten Tomatoes, the film holds an approval rating of 83% based on 114 reviews, with an average rating of 7.00/10. The site's critics consensus reads: "This doc about the making of Vogues biggest issue and its frosty editor-in-chief is fascinating eye candy and light-on-its-feet fun." On Metacritic, it has a weighted average score of 69 out of 100, based on 28 reviews, indicating "generally favorable reviews".

Demand for namesake
Due to the popularity of the film, the September 2007 issue of Vogue that was documented in the film has peaked to prices between $80 and $115 on eBay, making it one of the most sought after issues ever. Although the 840-page issue is massive, it is not the biggest Vogue issue ever, as the September 2012 issue beats it by 76 pages (916).

References

External links
 
 
 
 
 

2009 films
2009 documentary films
2009 in fashion
American documentary films
Documentary films about fashion designers
Documentary films about the media
Documentary films about women
Films directed by R. J. Cutler
Roadside Attractions films
Vogue (magazine)
Works about fashion magazine publishing
2000s English-language films
2000s American films